Ectillaenus is a genus of trilobites in the order Corynexochida.

These nektobenthic carnivores lived in the Ordovician period, from 478.6 to 449.5 Ma.

Taxonomy
Species include:
Ectillaenus advena (Barrande, 1872)
Ectillaenus benignensis (Novák in Perner, 1918)
Ectillaenus holubi  (Šnajdr, 1956)
Ectillaenus katzeri (Barrande, 1872)
Ectillaenus sarkaensis (Novák in Perner, 1918)

Distribution
Fossils of this genus have been found in the Ordovician sediments of Czech Republic, France, Morocco, Portugal, Spain and United Kingdom, as well as in the Arenig of the United Kingdom.

References 

Corynexochida genera
Illaenina
Ordovician trilobites
Extinct animals of Europe